Edward Sloman Minor (December 13, 1840July 26, 1924) was an American businessman, Republican politician, and Wisconsin pioneer.  He served six terms in the United States House of Representatives, representing northeastern Wisconsin (1895–1907).  He was also the 7th and 16th mayor of Sturgeon Bay, Wisconsin, represented Door County for seven years in the Wisconsin Legislature, and served as a Union Army cavalry officer during the American Civil War.

Early life

Edward S. Minor was born on December 13, 1840, in Jefferson County, New York.  As a child, he moved to the Wisconsin Territory with his parents, settling in the town of Greenfield, in Milwaukee County.  They soon moved to Milwaukee, where his father worked as a ship calker and Edward attended the public schools.  The family moved to a homestead in Sheboygan County, Wisconsin, in 1852, where they worked as farm laborers.

In the Spring of 1858, Edward Minor went north to Door County, Wisconsin, walking from Baileys Harbor to Fish Creek to claim a plot of land for the family from the General Land Office.  The rest of the family joined him there in July.

Civil War service
At the outbreak of the American Civil War, Minor volunteered for service in the Union Army and was enrolled as a private in Company G of the 2nd Wisconsin Cavalry Regiment.  The 2nd Wisconsin Cavalry served in the western theater of the war and west of the Mississippi.

He was promoted to corporal, and sergeant, and re-enlisted as a veteran with the regiment after the expiration of his three year enlistment.  At the end of the war, he was commissioned as a second lieutenant, and was then promoted to first lieutenant in July 29, 1865.  He mustered out with the regiment in November 1865.

Political career

After the war, Minor worked as a merchant in Fish Creek, dealing in timber products.

He was elected to the Wisconsin State Assembly in 1877, representing Door County in the 31st Wisconsin Legislature.  He did not run for re-election in 1878, but ran again in 1879 and 1880, and won both elections.

In 1882, Minor won a four-year term in the Wisconsin State Senate.  He represented the 1st State Senate district, which then comprised most of the northeast quadrant of the state, and was elected president pro tempore of the Senate for the 1885 session.

During his earlier Assembly term, he supported the construction of the Sturgeon Bay Ship Canal, and during his Senate term he was appointed superintendent of the canal and moved to Sturgeon Bay, Wisconsin.  He remained in this office until 1891, and served as a member of the Wisconsin Fish Commission for four years.  He was then elected mayor of Sturgeon Bay in 1894.

Congress

Later that year, he was nominated as the Republican candidate for the United States House of Representatives in Wisconsin's 8th congressional district.  He went on to defeat incumbent Democrat Lyman E. Barnes in the 1894 general election.  He was subsequently re-elected three times in this district, in 1896, 1898, and 1900.  After the 1900 United States census, another congressional district was added to Wisconsin's delegation, and in the redistricting, Minor's county was moved from the 8th congressional district to the 9th.  Minor was elected to two more terms in Congress representing the 9th congressional district.  In 1906, however, Minor was defeated in the primary election by Gustav Küstermann, who went on to succeed him in 1907.

During his time in Congress, he was active in the work of the House Committee on Merchant Marine and Fisheries, especially concerning funding for improvements of rivers and harbors.  He was chairman of the Committee on Expenditures for the Department of the Interior during the 58th and 59th congresses.  He was well-known among the political class in Washington, D.C., and was described as a trusted friend of Theodore Roosevelt.

Later years

After leaving office, he was appointed postmaster at Sturgeon Bay from 1911 through 1915, and was elected to another term as mayor in 1918.  He died at his home in Sturgeon Bay on July 26, 1924, after a month-long decline in his health. He was interred at Sturgeon Bay's Bayside Cemetery.

Personal life and family
Edward S. Minor was one of five children born to Martin Minor and his wife Abigail ( St. Ores).  The Minors were descendants of early British colonists to the Massachusetts Bay Colony.

Edward Minor married Mathilda Eloiza "Tillie" Graham in 1867.  Tillie was the daughter of Oliver Perry Graham, another Door County pioneer who erected the first lumber mill at Sturgeon Bay.  Edward and Tillie had at least six children, though only five survived him.  His eldest son, Stanton, worked as his private secretary during his years in Congress and was an unsuccessful candidate for Wisconsin State Assembly.

He was a member of the Independent Order of Odd Fellows, the Military Order of the Loyal Legion of the United States, and the Grand Army of the Republic.

Electoral history

Wisconsin Assembly (1877, 1879, 1880)

| colspan="6" style="text-align:center;background-color: #e9e9e9;"| General Election, November 6, 1877

| colspan="6" style="text-align:center;background-color: #e9e9e9;"| General Election, November 4, 1879

| colspan="6" style="text-align:center;background-color: #e9e9e9;"| General Election, November 2, 1880

Wisconsin Senate (1882)

| colspan="6" style="text-align:center;background-color: #e9e9e9;"| General Election, November 7, 1882

U.S. House of Representatives, 8th district (1894, 1896, 1898, 1900)

U.S. House of Representatives, 9th district (1902, 1904)

References

External links

1840 births
1924 deaths
People from Jefferson County, New York
People from Greenfield, Wisconsin
Politicians from Milwaukee
People from Sturgeon Bay, Wisconsin
People of Wisconsin in the American Civil War
Union Army officers
Republican Party members of the Wisconsin State Assembly
Republican Party Wisconsin state senators
Mayors of places in Wisconsin
Republican Party members of the United States House of Representatives from Wisconsin